This is a list of members of the Australian House of Representatives from 1963 to 1966, as elected at the 1963 federal election.

 At this time, the members for the Northern Territory and Australian Capital Territory could only vote on matters relating to their respective territories.
 The Liberal member for Denison, Athol Townley died on 24 December 1963; Liberal candidate Adrian Gibson won the resulting by-election on 15 February 1964.
 The Liberal member for Angas, Alick Downer, resigned on 23 April 1964; Liberal candidate Geoff Giles won the resulting by-election on 20 June.
 The Liberal member for Parramatta, Sir Garfield Barwick, resigned on 24 April 1964; Liberal candidate Nigel Bowen won the resulting by-election on 20 June.
 The Liberal member for Robertson, Roger Dean, resigned on 30 September 1964; Liberal candidate William Bridges-Maxwell won the resulting by-election on 5 December.
 The Country Party member for Riverina, Hugh Roberton, resigned on 21 January 1965; Country Party candidate Bill Armstrong won the resulting by-election on 27 February.
 The Country Party member for Dawson, George Shaw, died on 9 January 1966; Labor candidate Rex Patterson won the resulting by-election on 26 February.
 The member for Batman, Sam Benson, was expelled from the Australian Labor Party in September 1966 over his support for the Vietnam War. He served out his term as an independent.

References

Members of Australian parliaments by term
20th-century Australian politicians